Highbridge Multi-Strategy Fund Limited (LSE : HMSF) is a Guernsey domiciled investment company. The company, launched in 2006, originally invested its assets in the AllBlue and AllBlue Leveraged strategies, managed by BlueCrest Limited.

External links
 Official site

Investment trusts of the United Kingdom
Financial services companies established in 2006